Self-expression values are part of a core value dimension in the modernization process. Self-expression is a cluster of values that include social tolerance, life satisfaction, public expression and an aspiration to liberty. Ronald Inglehart, the University of Michigan professor who developed the theory of post-materialism, has worked extensively with this concept. On the Inglehart–Welzel Cultural Map self-expression values are contrasted with survival values, illustrating the changes in values across countries and generations.  The idea that the world is moving towards self-expression values was discussed at length in an article in the Economist. expression of your personality, emotions, or ideas, especially through art, music, or acting, such as speech and dance, or other medium. It is to reveal yourself to others in a way that is special to yourself.

Emergence of self-expression values
The emergence of the post-industrial society has brought about a wave of cultural change. In the United States, Canada, Western Europe, and a growing share of East Asia, a majority of the people are no longer employed in factories, but work in the service sector instead. There has been a shift from a mechanical environment to one where ever more people spend their days dealing with other people, symbols, and information, which means that workers in the knowledge sector must exercise their own judgment and choice.

This shift has had major consequences:
 Unprecedentedly high levels of prosperity and welfare states that make food, clothing, shelter, housing, education and health service available to almost everyone. Even in the United States, where the welfare state is relatively limited, a significant portion of the GDP is redistributed through the state. This makes physical survival, a minimum living standard, and an average life expectancy of nearly 80 years to be taken for granted by people living in the respective societies, which encourages people to focus on goals beyond immediate survival.
 Modern service jobs increasingly require use of cognitive skills. Engineers, teachers, lawyers, accountants, counselors, programmers and analysts all belong to the creative class. These workers have high autonomy in their work, even if they sometimes continue to work in hierarchical organizations. The need for cognitive skills is dramatically larger than in societies in the early stages of industrialization. To meet these needs, the labor forces of post-industrial societies increasingly pursue higher education, emphasizing creativity, imagination and intellectual independence. 
 Post-industrial societies are socially liberating compared to their predecessors. The centrally controlled, highly regimented work forces of the industrial world are gone, as are the strong conformity pressures that accompanied them. The traditional system—in which children's survival depended on their parents' providing for them, in return for which the children would take care of the parents in old age—has been undermined by the welfare state. As a result, close-knit family structures, once a necessity for survival, become increasingly a matter of choice, replacing "communities of necessity" with "elective affinities."

The destandardization of economic activities and social life diminishes social constraints in unprecedented ways. The shift in post-industrial societies is thus one of emancipation from authority.

Self-expression values and democracy
Industrialization can lead to fascism, communism, theocracy or democracy. But post-industrial society brings socio-cultural changes that make truly effective democracy increasingly probable.

Knowledge societies cannot function effectively without highly educated workers, who become articulate and accustomed to thinking for themselves. Furthermore, rising levels of economic security bring growing emphasis on self-expression values that give high priority to free choice. Mass publics become increasingly likely to want democracy, and increasingly effective in getting it. Repressing mass demands for liberalization becomes increasingly costly and detrimental to economic effectiveness. These changes link economic development with democracy.

Empirical measurements of self-expression values
The most thorough assessment of self-expression values is carried out in the World Values Survey. Five "waves" have been conducted so far, each adding additional countries to the survey.

Subsequent data analysis by Inglehart revealed that a large percentage in the variability in the data could be explained by using a set of measures that tapped just two dimensions: a traditional to secular-rational axis, and a survival to self-expression axis. The factor scores were originally based on 22 variables, but this was reduced to only 10 (5 for each dimension) for the purposes of data availability.

The self-expression axis has the following factor loadings.

Despite comprising only five variables, the correlates for this dimension across the WV survey are very strong. Below is a partial list. Positive answers indicate survival values, the opposite of self-expression values.

See also
 Affluenza
 Consumerism 
 Gross national happiness 
 Abraham Maslow
 Theory of Basic Human Values

References 

Cultural studies
Political science